The Azerbaijan national under-18 football team are a feeder team for the main Azerbaijan national football team. The team is controlled by the AFFA.

Current squad
Azerbaijan under-18 national team had a training camp on 4-19 January 2018 in Baku.
The following players were called up for the training process, is as below:

|-----
! colspan="9" bgcolor="#B0D3FB" align="left" |
|----- bgcolor="#DFEDFD"

|-----
! colspan="9" bgcolor="#B0D3FB" align="left" |
|----- bgcolor="#DFEDFD"

|-----
! colspan="9" bgcolor="#B0D3FB" align="left" |
|----- bgcolor="#DFEDFD"

See also
 Azerbaijan national football team
 Azerbaijan national under-23 football team
 Azerbaijan national under-21 football team
 Azerbaijan national under-20 football team
 Azerbaijan national under-19 football team
 Azerbaijan national under-17 football team

References

European national under-18 association football teams
Under-18
Youth football in Azerbaijan